Michal Kováč (3 August 1930 – 5 October 2016) was the first president of Slovakia, having served from 1993 through 1998.

Early life
Kováč was born in the village of Ľubiša in then Czechoslovakia in 1930. He graduated from the present-day University of Economics in Bratislava and was a bank employee of the Státní banka československá and of other banks. As such, he spent some years in London and in Cuba in the 1960s. During the Normalization he was subject to some persecution.

Political career
During and after the Velvet Revolution, from 12 December 1989 to 17 May 1991 (when he resigned) Kováč was the Finance Minister of the Slovak (Socialist) Republic.

In early 1991, he was one of the founders and the vice-chairman of the Movement for a Democratic Slovakia. As such, he was elected as a deputy to the Federal Assembly of Czechoslovakia in 1990. After the 1992 election he served as the Chairman of the Federal Assembly from 25 June to 31 December 1992. He played an important role in the process of the preparation of the Dissolution of Czechoslovakia.

President (1993–98)
Kováč was elected president by the National Council of Slovakia in February 1993 (because he was a candidate of the biggest parliamentary party—the Movement for a Democratic Slovakia) and inaugurated on 2 March 1993. He soon became a strong opponent of Prime Minister Vladimír Mečiar and by giving a critical presidential address to parliament in March 1994, Kováč significantly contributed to the deposition of the then Mečiar government and the creation of the Moravčík government (which only lasted until the next parliamentary election in the autumn of 1994).

In 1995 the Mečiar-Kováč conflict intensified and the Movement for a Democratic Slovakia cancelled Kováč's (formal) membership in the party. In August 1995 Kováč's son, who had been accused of financial crimes by German authorities (the accusation was later withdrawn), was kidnapped and taken to Austria. The president, opposition parties and Austrian court accused the Slovak intelligence service (SIS) and the government of having organized this kidnapping. The investigation of new secret intelligence service director Mitro and Slovak police after collapse of Meciar's regime in the end of 1998 confirmed the participation of the SIS on this kidnaping, but the Slovak justice rejected the trial of its suspected actors because of an amnesty (also called self-amnesty) issued by Vladimir Meciar on 3 March 1998. This amnesty was revoked in 2017 and in a case over a potential European Arrest Warrant, the European Court of Justice is asked tu rule on the legality of the proceedings against the suspected kidnappers (case C‑203/20).

Kováč's term ended on 2 March 1998. His candidature in the first direct 1999 Slovak presidential election was unsuccessful. He was not very visible in Slovakian politics after this time and appeared only at a few symbolic events.

Health and death
On 10 July 2008 the Slovak media reported that Kováč probably suffered from Parkinson's disease. The former president did not confirm this information but admitted that he had some health problems.

On 5 October 2016, Kováč died from complications of Parkinson's disease in Bratislava, aged 86.

Honours
: Grand Master and Grand Cross (or 1st Class) of the Order of the White Double Cross.
: Grand Cross of the Order of Merit of the Republic of Poland (1994)
: Order of the White Eagle (1997)
: Knight Grand Cross with Collar	of the Order of Merit of the Italian Republic (1997)
In 1993, Kovac became the first winner of the Golden Biatec Award, the highest award bestowed by Slovakia’s Informal Economic Forum – Economic Club.

References

External links

1930 births
2016 deaths
People from Humenné District
People's Party – Movement for a Democratic Slovakia politicians
Presidents of Slovakia
Finance ministers of Slovakia
University of Economics in Bratislava alumni
Slovak Roman Catholics